HMS Blackcock was a tugboat which was operated by the Royal Navy during World War I. While on a mission it ran aground near Tsypnavolok, Russia, on 18 January 1918. It had to be abandoned and it was later thought to have been crushed by ice.

History

The ship was built in 1885 by famed shipbuilders Laird Brothers Ltd of Birkenhead and delivered to the Liverpool company Liverpool Screw Towing & Lighterage Co Ltd.

At the outbreak of World War I the ship was hired by the British Royal Navy on 11 August 1914 and was later purchased outright on 4 November 1915.

There the two warships assisted in the destruction of the German light cruiser . Though lightly armed, the tugs were ready to assist. They were not called upon, but according to Commander in Chief, Vice-Admiral Herbert King-Hall, the example the tugs "set was most praiseworthy."

On 17 January 1918 the ship, commanded by Lieutenant Robert Weir, set off on a mission to deliver supplies and passengers from Vardø, Norway to Murmansk, Russia. The next morning at 07:45 on 18 January 1918 the ship ran aground and started to take on water. Lifeboats were dropped and all the passengers and some of the crew were taken to the shore. They walked along the shore through very difficult weather until they reached the community of Tsypnavolok. At the town a rescue party made up of dog sleds returned to the tug and got the rest of the crew. There were no deaths but some of the crew and passengers suffered frostbite. The tug was abandoned and later believed to have been crushed in the ice and lost.

Annotations

Bibliography 
Notes

References 

 

 - Total pages: 336 

Tugboats of the Royal Navy
Ships built at Laird & Son Co, Birkenhead
1885 ships
Tugboats of the United Kingdom
World War I Tugboats of the United Kingdom
Shipwrecks in the Barents Sea
Royal Navy ship names
Maritime incidents in 1918